Ed Wilson (July 29, 1945 – October 3, 2010), born Edson Vieira de Barros, was a Brazilian rock singer-songwriter and founder of the musical group Renato e Seus Blue Caps. Once part of the Jovem Guarda movement, he was later linked to the Gospel music scene.

Ed Wilson died on October 3, 2010, in Rio de Janeiro due to cancer.

Discography

Albums

References

External links
 [ Ed Wilson] at Allmusic

1945 births
2010 deaths
Musicians from Rio de Janeiro (city)
Música Popular Brasileira singers
20th-century Brazilian male singers
20th-century Brazilian singers
Jovem Guarda
Brazilian Protestants
Brazilian gospel singers
Brazilian rock singers
Deaths from cancer in Rio de Janeiro (state)